Schmedes is a surname. Notable people with the surname include:

Erik Schmedes (1868–1931), Danish-born operatic tenor who performed mainly in Germany and Austria
Karl Schmedes (1908–1981), German boxer
Kelly Schmedes (born 1983), American soccer player